Adnan Hamad Majid Al-Abbassi (born 1 February 1961) is an Iraqi football manager and former player.

Career

Playing career

Adnan was born in Samarra, Iraq, the son of a wealthy land-owning family.  Hed started his career with the Samarra in 1975 juniors at the age of 14 before. In 1982 Adnan was called up by the famous Iraq national coach Wathiq Naji to join the Salah-Al-Deen club, where he spending only one season with Salah-Al-Deen club which they won the Iraq Super League cup of the  1982–83 season.Yugoslav coach Miodgard Stankovic known as Aba later called the young Adnan into the Iraq Under-19 team. later he moved to Baghdad and signed for Al-Zawraa. In 1984, he was called up by Ammo Baba to the Iraq national football team for the 1984 Gulf Cup. He later went on to make over 20 appearances for the national team winning the 1985 Pan-Arab Games & and 1985 Arab Cup. He also played for Al-Talaba and Al-Tayaran club teams in Iraq.

Managerial career

After being plagued by injuries during the latter parts of his career, he went into coaching and managed his home club Samarra in a player-coach role in the 1992–93 season. During this time he also managed to score 33 goals for the club. He later became the coach of Al-Zawraa and was assistant coach of the Iraq national football team to Yahya Alwan during the 1996 AFC Asian Cup in the United Arab Emirates.

Hamad spent time in Europe studying coaching techniques before coaching abroad in the UAE with Dubai SC. He first coached the Iraq national team in February 2000 and led the team to third place at the 2000 West Asian Football Federation Championship in Amman. He was then replaced by Milan Zivadinovic only two months before the 2000 AFC Asian Cup in Lebanon.

Adnan was back as the national coach of Iraq for the second time a year later after Milan Zivadinovic was sacked. Hamad led Iraq to the second round of the 2002 FIFA World Cup qualifiers before he was replaced by Croatian Rudolf Belin after two consecutive defeats to Bahrain and Saudi Arabia in the opening three matches of the tournament.

His third period as coach of Iraq came in 2002 when he helped Iraq to the WAFF Championship win in Damascus with a dramatic 3–2 win over Jordan in extra-time before being replaced with the German Bernd Stange. Hamad had a short stint as manager of the Lebanon national team between 22 January 2004 and 8 February 2004. He regained his position as coach of Iraq when Bernd Stange left in 2004 a year after the 2003 invasion of Iraq by the United States.

He was national coach of Jordan between 2009 and 2013. He led them to the quarter-finals of the 2011 Asian Cup and the play-off round of the 2014 FIFA World Cup qualification.

On 7 February 2014, Hamad was appointed to coach Baniyas in the UAE Arabian Gulf League.

On 6 August 2014, Hamed was appointed to coach Bahrain on a two-year contract. He later coached Al-Wehdat in 2016–2017. On 16 June 2021, he was reappointed as the head coach of Jordan.

Managerial statistics

Honors

As manager

Club
Al-Zawraa
Iraqi Premier League: 1996, 2000
Iraq FA Cup: 1996, 2000
Iraqi Elite Cup: 1999, 2003
Iraqi Super Cup: 1999, 2000

Al-Faisaly
AFC Cup: 2006
Jordan FA Shield: 2008
Jordan Super Cup: 2006

International
Iraq U20
AFC U-19 Championship: 2000

Iraq
WAFF: 2002

Individual
AFC Coach of the Year: 2004
Lebanese Premier League Best Coach: 2005–06

Footnotes

External links

1961 births
Living people
Iraqi footballers
Association football forwards
Al-Zawraa SC players
Iraqi football managers
2004 AFC Asian Cup managers
2011 AFC Asian Cup managers
Iraq national football team managers
Jordan national football team managers
Al-Shorta SC managers
People from Samarra
Al-Faisaly SC managers
Al-Zawraa SC managers
Expatriate football managers in Jordan
Iraqi expatriate football managers
Expatriate football managers in Lebanon
Iraqi expatriate sportspeople in Lebanon
Iraqi expatriate sportspeople in Jordan
Lebanon national football team managers
Iraq international footballers
Bahrain national football team managers
Iraqi expatriate sportspeople in Bahrain
Expatriate football managers in Bahrain
Iraqi expatriate sportspeople in the United Arab Emirates
Expatriate football managers in the United Arab Emirates
UAE Pro League managers
Iraqi Premier League managers
Lebanese Premier League managers
Jordanian Pro League managers
Al-Wehdat SC managers
Dubai Club managers
Salahaddin FC players
Al-Talaba SC players
Al-Quwa Al-Jawiya players
Iraqi Premier League players
AFC Cup winning managers